

List of Ambassadors
Noah Gal Gendler 2019-
Boaz Rodkin (Non-Resident, Tirana) 2016 - 2019
David Cohen (diplomat) (Non-Resident, Tirana) 2012 - 2015
Amira Arnon (Non-Resident, Jerusalem) 2007 - 2009
Irit Ben-Abba (Non-Resident, Jerusalem) 2004 - 2006
Judith Varnai-Shorer,

References

Bosnia
Israel